Kumna is a village in Harku Parish, Harju County in northern Estonia. It has a population of 290 (as of 1 June 2010).

Kumna has been the site of a manor house since the 17th century. The current manor house was built in 1913 in a neoclassical style.

In 1865 a silver hoard from the 13th century BC was found in Kumna.

Gallery

References

External links
Kumna at Estonian Manors Portal

Villages in Harju County
Kreis Harrien